This is a 2017 timeline of events in the Somali Civil War (2009–present).

January
January 25 – At least 28 people are killed in an al-Shabaab attack on a hotel in Mogadishu.
January 27 – al-Shabaab militants kill dozens of Kenyan troops in a raid in southern Somalia's African Union base.

February
February 8 – Unidentified gunmen raid a hotel in Bosaso killing four guards and 2 militants. Officials blame al-Shabaab although the group denied having orchestrated the attack.
February 19 – A car bomb explodes outside a market in the Wadajir District, killing at least 39 people and injuring 50 more.
February 27 – A car bomb explodes near Mogadishu's army checkout point wounding 4 Somali soldiers after al-Shabaab vows an attack.

March
March 13 – At least 6 people are killed and four others wounded from a vehicle filled with explosives exploding near a hotel in Mogadishu.
March 14 – Pirates seize a United Arab Emirates owned oil tanker, Aris 13, kidnapping 8 Sri Lankan crew members. This is the first incident of piracy off the coast since 2012.
March 16 – The pirates that seized Aris 13 free the vessel without a ransom.
March 21 – A car bomb explodes outside President Mohamed Abdullahi Mohamed's official residence at Villa Somalia, killing at least five people.

April
April 3 – Somali pirates hijack an Indian owned cargo ship off the coast of Puntland.
April 7 – A mortar attack suspected to have been perpetrated by al-Shabaab kills three civilians and injures five more in the Wadajir District.
April 9 – An al-Shabaab car bomb outside the Ministry of Defence in Mogadishu kills 15 people.
April 10 – An al-Shabaab militant kills 9 soldiers in a suicide bomb attack in a military training camp in Mogadishu.
April 14 – The United States begins deploying troops to help the Somali government fight al-Shabaab, the first time since 1994.

May
May 3 – Somali Public Works Minister Abbas Abdullahi Sheikh Siraji is shot dead by Somali forces mistaking him for a militant.
May 6 – A United States Navy SEAL is killed and three others injured in a gunfight with al-Shabaab in Mogadishu. This is the first time an American soldier was killed in combat in Somalia since 1993.

June
June 8 – An al-Shabaab attack on a military base in Puntland leaves at least 70 people dead in what Somali officials call the deadliest attack in the country for years.
June 14 – In Mogadishu, a suicide car bomb explodes outside Posh Treats, an eatery and night club also operating as a guest house. Five al-Shabaab gunmen then raid Pizza House, a neighboring pizza restaurant and nightclub.  The gunmen took hostages and holed up for 11 hours, killing 31 civilians and five security force members in the process, many at point-blank range. All five gunmen are ultimately killed by security forces.

July
July 30 – A car bomb explodes near a police station in Mogadishu resulting in at least 6 fatalities and 13 injuries.

September
September 29 – At least 15 soldiers are killed in an al-Shabaab raid on a Somali military base in Mogadishu.

October
October 14 – A truck bomb exploded outside the Safari Hotel in Mogadishu; at least 587 people are confirmed to have been killed in one of the deadliest terrorist attacks in the country to date.
October 28 – An explosion from a truck bomb occurred in Mogadishu. There were two more explosions, one from a suicide bomber. These bombings killed at least 25 people and injured 30.

See also
Operation Indian Ocean
Somali Civil War (2009–present)

References

2017 in Somalia
Somalia
2017
Lists of armed conflicts in 2017